Mitrella nitidulina is a species of sea snail in the family Columbellidae, the dove snails.

Description
The length of the shell attains 10.5 mm.

Distribution
This species occurs in the Atlantic Ocean off the Western Sahara.

References

 Sysoev A.V. (2014). Deep-sea fauna of European seas: An annotated species check-list of benthic invertebrates living deeper than 2000 m in the seas bordering Europe. Gastropoda. Invertebrate Zoology. Vol.11. No.1: 134–155

External links
 Locard, A. (1897-1898). Expéditions scientifiques du Travailleur et du Talisman pendant les années 1880, 1881, 1882 et 1883. Mollusques testacés. Paris, Masson. vol. 1 (1897)
 Gofas, S.; Le Renard, J.; Bouchet, P. (2001). Mollusca. in: Costello, M.J. et al. (eds), European Register of Marine Species: a check-list of the marine species in Europe and a bibliography of guides to their identification. Patrimoines Naturels. 50: 180-213
 Gofas, S.; Luque, Á.; Urra, J. (2019). Planktotrophic Columbellidae (Gastropoda) in the northeast Atlantic and the Mediterranean Sea, with description of a new species in the genus Mitrella. Bulletin of Marine Science. 96(1): 145-168
 Bouchet, P. & Warén, A. (1985). Revision of the Northeast Atlantic bathyal and abyssal Neogastropoda excluding Turridae (Mollusca, Gastropoda). Bollettino Malacologico. supplement 1: 121-296

nitidulina
Gastropods described in 1897